Jagannath Sarkar may refer to:
 Jagannath Sarkar (CPI politician), Communist Party of India politician
 Jagannath Sarkar (BJP politician), Bharatiya Janata Party politician